Martin Christopher Bayfield (born 21 December 1966) is an English actor, broadcaster, and former rugby union player who played lock forward for Northampton Saints, Bedford Blues and England, gaining 31 England and 3 Lions caps.

Early life and career

Bayfield was born in Bedford and was educated at Bedford School. He served with the Metropolitan Police from 1985 to 1989, before transferring to Bedfordshire Police. The 208 cm (6 ft 10in) tall Bayfield made his England debut in 1991, and although he was omitted from the 1991 World Cup squad, he was a part of the 1992 Five Nations Grand Slam winning side. He went on the 1993 British Lions tour to New Zealand, and was part of the 1995 World Cup squad. He would play 18 times partnering Martin Johnson. His final appearance for England came in the 1996 Five Nations match against Wales.

His last game was against Gloucester in February 1998; a neck injury sustained in training a few days later forced him to retire.

Film and television career
Since retirement, Bayfield has worked as a journalist, an after-dinner speaker, and has appeared in all of the Harry Potter films playing the half-giant Hagrid, as Robbie Coltrane's body and stunt double (he also appeared in Harry Potter and the Chamber of Secrets as a young Rubeus Hagrid). Continuing the acting theme, he also played a cyclops in Jonathan Liebesman's Wrath of the Titans, the sequel to the 2010 movie Clash of the Titans. Bayfield also played "Rugby Player 1" in an episode of the BBC One series New Tricks (first shown on 1 September 2008).

In his broadcasting career, Bayfield has presented the NFL and World's Strongest Man coverage on UK Channel Five and worked as a rugby correspondent on BBC Radio 5 Live. He also served as a presenter for ITV's coverage of the 2007 and 2011 Rugby World Cups, as well as presenting ITV's Guinness Premiership highlights. From 2012-2016, he co-presented BBC's Crimewatch with Kirsty Young. From 23 August 2018 Martin took part in Celebrity Masterchef of which he reached the final three shown on BBC one on 28 September 2018.

In 2013, BT Sport acquired the exclusive rights to the Aviva Premiership. Bayfield (along with his ITV co-presenter Craig Doyle) moved to the new channel and he now works as a presenter, pundit and pitchside reporter.

Personal life
Bayfield is married to his second wife Jane Goodman, and has three daughters, Roseanna, Polly and Lucy whom he had with his first wife, Helena.

In August 2014, Bayfield was one of 200 public figures who were signatories to a letter to The Guardian expressing their hope that Scotland would vote to remain part of the United Kingdom in September's referendum on that issue.

He is actively involved with charity, and is an Honorary President of the Wooden Spoon Society, the rugby charity that supports disadvantaged children and young people.

Bayfield released A Very Tall Story, a memoir of his rugby days, on Sept. 15, 2022.

Filmography

Film

References

External links

Sporting Heroes
statistics from scrum.com
Bayfs Blog

1966 births
Living people
British & Irish Lions rugby union players from England
British police officers
Metropolitan Police officers
English rugby union players
Northampton Saints players
Bedford Blues players
People educated at Bedford School
Rugby union locks
Rugby union players from Bedford
England international rugby union players
National Football League announcers
English rugby union commentators
BT Sport presenters and reporters
English people of German descent
Male actors from Bedfordshire